Indian redwood may refer to:

Caesalpinia sappan, a tree in the family Fabaceae
Chukrasia tabularis, a tree in the family Meliaceae